Grupa  is a village in the administrative district of Gmina Dragacz, within Świecie County, Kuyavian-Pomeranian Voivodeship, in north-central Poland. It is located within the historic region of Pomerania.

The village has a population of 541.

History

Grupa was a private village within the Polish Crown, owned by various Polish nobles, incl. the Kopycki and Żelisławski families, administratively located in the Świecie County in the Pomeranian Voivodeship.

During the German occupation of Poland (World War II), from September to December 1939, Grupa was the site of large massacres of Poles from the Świecie County, carried out by the Germans as part of the Intelligenzaktion Pommern. The Germans burned bodies of the victims in attempt to cover up the crime.

References

Grupa
Nazi war crimes in Poland